Olga Belova may refer to:

 Olga Belova (rhythmic gymnast) (born 1983), Russian rhythmic gymnast
 Olga Belova (water polo) (born 1993), Russian water polo player
 Olga Artemyeva (née Belova), Russian chess player, wife of chess Grandmaster Vladislav Artemiev